Ongole Assembly constituency is a constituency of the Andhra Pradesh Legislative Assembly, India. It is one among 8 constituencies in the Prakasham district. Balineni Srinivasa Reddy (YSR Congress Party) won the seat in 2019 elections. Indian National Congress won 7 times, Telugu Desam Party won 4 times, independents won 2 times, YSR Congress Party won 2 times.

Balineni Srinivasa Reddy of YSR Congress Party is currently representing the constituency.

Overview
It is part of the Ongole Lok Sabha constituency along with another six Vidhan Sabha segments: Yerragondapalem, Darsi, Kondapi, Markapuram, Giddalur and Kanigiri in Prakasam district.

Mandals

Members of Legislative Assembly

Election results

Assembly elections 2019

Assembly elections 2014

Assembly Elections 2009

Assembly Elections 2004

Assembly elections 1999

Assembly elections 1994

Assembly elections 1989

Assembly elections 1985

Assembly elections 1983

Assembly elections 1978

Assembly elections 1972

Assembly elections 1967

Assembly elections 1962

1957 By-election

"
"

Assembly elections 1952

See also
 List of constituencies of Andhra Pradesh Legislative Assembly

References

Assembly constituencies of Andhra Pradesh
Ongole